Poophagus is a genus of beetles belonging to the family Curculionidae.

The species of this genus are found in Europe and Northern America.

Species:
 Poophagus araneipes Faust, 1882 
 Poophagus hopffgarteni Tourn., 1872-1876
 Poophagus sisymbrii Fabricius, 1777

References

Curculionidae
Curculionidae genera